Max Alvarado (February 19, 1929 – April 6, 1997) was a FAMAS award-winning Filipino film actor known mainly by his portrayals of villains in a career which spanned six decades.

Early life
Max Alvarado was born as Gavino Maximo Teodosio in Manila. In his youth, he was a member of street gangs, as well as an itinerant manual laborer.

Career 
He broke into films in 1948 as a bit player in Halik sa Bandila. Soon after, he was frequently cast as a villain in films produced by Premiere Production and its sister company, Larry Santiago Productions, as well as People's Pictures. He first gained critical notice in the 1953 film Ang Sawa sa Lumang Simboryo directed by Gerry de Leon. For that role, he garnered a FAMAS Best Supporting Actor nomination. Ultimately, Alvarado was nominated for 5 FAMAS Best Supporting Actor nominations, winning the trophy in 1971 for Ang Kampana ng Sta. Quiteria.

Alvarado was also nominated for a FAMAS Best Actor award in 1968 for Tatak Sakramentos. Beginning in 1967 with Alyas Chain Gang, he was cast in leading and supporting roles even as a romantic lead, despite his swarthy and somewhat villainous appearance. Alvarado also showcased his versatility by sometimes playing gay roles, such as in the 1978 film Gorgonia as well as Non-Villain or supporting Roles. As a villain, Alvarado was frequently cast opposite the heroic roles of Fernando Poe Jr., although he has also portrayed a supporting ally to the latter in films such as "Walang Matigas na Tinapay sa Mainit na Kape" alongside Paquito Diaz, also in a non-antagonist role which starred former child star Vandolph, and fellow villain actor Paquito's younger brother Romy Diaz as the main antagonist.

On March 25, 1982, D'Wild Wild Weng started its theatrical run. In the film Alvarado is paired with Weng Weng, they play a duo who are sent to the countryside to investigate the murder a mayor and his family.

Towards the end of his life, Alvarado became a commercial spokesperson for Maxx candy, a popular rock candy eponymous to his own screen name.

Death
He died from heart attack on April 6, 1997, at the age of 68.
His remains is at Manila North Green Park in Santa Cruz, Manila

Filmography

Film

Selected filmography

1949 - Kayumangi [Premiere]
1949 - Halik sa Bandila  [Premiere]
1951 - Sisa [Premiere]
1952 - Sandino [Manuel Vistan Jr.]
1952 - Sawa sa Lumang Simboryo [Premiere]
1955 - Dakilang Hudas [People's]
1955 - 7 Maria [Larry Santiago]
1956 - Desperado [People's]
1956 - Lo' Waist Gang [Larry Santiago]
1956 - Huling Mandirigma [People's]
1956 - Mrs. Jose Romulo [Larry Santiago]
1957 - Maskara [Premiere]
1957 - Kamay ni Cain [People's]
1957 - Bicol Express [Premiere]
1957 - Pusakal [People's]
1958 - Sta. Rita de Casia [Premiere]
1958 - Mga Liham kay Tia Dely [Larry Santiago]
1958 - Jeepney Rock [Spotlight]
1958 - Glory at Dawn [PMP]
1958 - 4 na Pulubi [Larry Santiago]
1959 - Mabilis Pa sa Lintik
1959 - Ang Maton
1959 - Ang Matapang Lamang
1960 - Huwag Mo Akong Limutin
1960 - Kadenang Putik
1961 - The Moises Padilla Story
1964 - Kidlat sa Baril
1965 - Isa Lang ang Hari
1967 - Alias Chain Gang
1967 - Durango
1967 - Pambraun
1968 - Ang Banal, ang Ganid, at ang Pusakal
1968 - Dugay Na sa Maynila (Tonto Ka Pa)
1968 - Eagle Commandos
1969 - Liquidation Squad
1969 - Godiva: The Naked Avenger
1970 - Totoy Guwapo
1971 - Gangsters Daw Kami!
1971 - Liezl at ang 7 Hoods
1971 - Baldo Is Coming
1972 - Kumander Erlinda
1972 - Jail Break
1972 - Santo Domingo
1973 - Sto. Cristo
1973 - Zoom, Zoom, Superman!
1973 - Hulihin si Tiagong Akyat
1974 - Kampanera Kuba [Berto]
1974 - Ang Pagbabalik ni Leon Guerrero
1975 - Alupihang Dagat
1975 - Dugo at Pag-Ibig sa Kapirasong Lupa [Salazar]
1976 - Peter Pandesal
1977 - Valentin Labrador
1977 - Gulapa
1977 - Kapten Batuten
1978 - Tatak ng Tundo [Enteng]
1979 - Nang Umapoy ang Karagatan [Barako]
1980 - Ang Panday [Lizardo]
1980 - Dolphy's Angels [Bertong Maize]
1980 - Kalibre .45
1981 - Pagbabalik ng Panday [Lizardo]
1981 - Darna at Ding
1982 - Daniel Bartolo ng Sapang Bato
1982 - Ang Panday: Ikatlong Yugto [Lizardo]
1982 - Pepeng Kaliwete
1983 - Kapag Buhay ang Inutang
1983 - Pieta [Temio]
1983 - Roman Sebastian
1984 - Ang Panday IV: Ika-Apat Na Aklat [Lizardo]
1984 - Pieta: Ikalawang Aklat [Temio]
1984 - Kapitan Inggo
1984 - Barakuda
1984 - Sigaw ng Katarungan [Masu]
1984 - Nardong Putik (Kilabot ng Cavite): Version II
1984 - Ang Padrino
1985 - Isa Isa Lang! [Masong]
1985 - Working Boys
1985 - Inday Bote [Black Saturday]
1985 - Ben Tumbling: A People's Journal Story [Koljack]
1986 - Iyo ang Tondo, Akin ang Cavite [Ponso]
1986 - Oras ng Kagitingan
1986 - Ninja Kids
1986 - Muslim .357
1986 - Asong Gubat [Ka Tonyo]
1987 - No Retreat... No Surrender... Si Kumander
1987 - Simaron ng Isabela
1987 - Dongalo Massacre
1987 - Puto
1988 - Kambal Tuko [Father To Pak]
1988 - Bobo Cop
1988 - Buy One, Take One
1988 - Petrang Kabayo at ang Pilyang Kuting [Kulas]
1988 - Agila ng Maynila [Badong Busangol]
1989 - Da Best in Da West
1989 - Captain Yagit [Doktor]
1989 - Bala... Dapat kay Cris Cuenca, Public Enemy No. 1
1990 - Hulihin Si... Nardong Toothpick
1990 - Isang Salop Na Bala
1990 - Sgt. Clarin: Bala Para sa Ulo Mo
1991 - Manong Gang [Poldo]
1992 - Alabang Girls [Mr. Malabanan]
1992 - Alyas Pogi 2
1993 - Dugo ng Panday [Lizardo]
1993 - Bulag, Pipi at Bingi
1993 - Manila Boy [Turko]
1994 - Hindi Pa Tapos ang Laban
1994 - Walang Matigas Na Tinapay sa Mainit Na Kape
1994 - Abrakadabra [Siga 1]
1995 - Bikini Watch
1995 - I Love You Sabado!!!
1996 - Ang Misis Kong Hoodlum
1996 - Ikaw ang Mahal Ko [Mianong]
1996 - Ang Syota Kong Balikbayan
1997 - Bagsik ng Kamao
1997 - Ang Pinakamahabang Baba sa Balat ng Lupa

References

1929 births
1997 deaths
20th-century comedians
20th-century Filipino male actors
Filipino male comedians
Filipino male film actors
Male actors from Manila